This is a list of wars involving Burkina Faso.

References

 
Burkina Faso
Wars